The Atlantis II Deep is a deep sea submarine basin located in the Red Sea, notable for containing hot brines.  It holds the largest known hydrothermal ore deposit on the seabed.

References 

Bodies of water of the Red Sea